John Busby (24 March 1765 – 10 May 1857) was an English-born surveyor and civil engineer, active in Australia. 

Early life
Busby was born in Alnwick, Northumberland, England, eldest son of George Busby, a miner and coalmaster of Stamford, and his wife Margaret, née Wilson, of Dunstan, Northumberland. Busby became a coal miner and later a mineral surveyor and civil engineer in Scotland, and was employed on various public work projects, including the provision of a water-supply for Leith fort. Busby received two of the Highland Society's awards; firstly for inventing machinery for ascertaining the nature of rock strata by boring, and secondly for developing a method of sinking through quicksands, clay and gravel beds. In 1810 he was employed on the Irish estate of the marquess of Downshire.

He married Sarah Kennedy in 1798 in Scotland. They had six sons and two daughters, all born in Scotland.

Australia
Busby and his family emigrated to New South Wales, Australia arriving at Sydney on 24 February 1824. He was engaged as mineral surveyor and civil engineer to the colony at a salary of £200 a year for 200 days in each year.

In June 1825 Busby made an interesting report on the state of the water-supply of Sydney, and suggested that a supply could be drawn from "the large lagoon in the vicinity of the paper mill" to a reservoir in Hyde Park from which it would be distributed throughout the city by pipes. The mill referred to was in the neighbourhood of the present corner of Bourke and Elizabeth Streets, Waterloo. In January 1826 he made a second report, in which he suggested expense could be saved by driving a tunnel into Sydney. This was begun, and in February 1829 Governor Darling stated in a dispatch that it was "quite impossible to dispense with Busby so long as the work in which he is employed introducing water into Sydney is in operation".

Busby's salary had in the meantime been increased to £500 a year, and the colonial office had questioned the necessity of retaining his services any longer and demanded a report on the project in 1832. The water-supply scheme was not completed until September 1837. It had involved the excavation of a tunnel about 12,000 feet (3,660 m) long, but the proposed reservoir at Hyde Park with pipes throughout the city was not gone on with. Busby's appointment terminated on the completion of the waterworks, and in August 1838 the payment to him of a sum of £1000 was sanctioned as a gratuity.

Sydney's first efficient water supply became known as "Busby's Bore". In this he was assisted by his son, William.

Late life
Busby retired to his country property Kirkton on the Hunter River which had been granted to him and died there on 10 May 1857. His grave and that of his wife is still preserved as of today at Kirkton (2011).

He was the father of James Busby, who is widely regarded as the "father" of the Australian wine industry.

References

G. P. Walsh, 'Busby, John (1765–1857)', Australian Dictionary of Biography, Volume 1, MUP, 1966, pp 188–189.

External links
 
 

1765 births
1857 deaths
English emigrants to Australia
People from Alnwick
British mining engineers
People from New South Wales
English surveyors